Stina Haage (3 August 1924 – 15 June 2017) was a Swedish gymnast who competed in the 1948 Summer Olympics, in London.

References

Further reading

External links

1924 births
2017 deaths
Swedish female artistic gymnasts
Olympic gymnasts of Sweden
Gymnasts at the 1948 Summer Olympics
20th-century Swedish women